Three.js is a cross-browser JavaScript library and application programming interface (API) used to create and display animated 3D computer graphics in a web browser using WebGL. The source code is hosted in a repository on GitHub.

Overview 
Three.js allows the creation of graphical processing unit (GPU)-accelerated 3D animations using the JavaScript language as part of a website without relying on proprietary browser plugins. This is possible due to the advent of WebGL, a low-level graphics API created specifically for the web.

High-level libraries such as Three.js or GLGE, SceneJS, PhiloGL, and many more make it possible to author complex 3D computer animations for display in the browser without the effort required for a traditional standalone application or a plugin.

History 
Three.js was first released by Ricardo Cabello on GitHub in April 2010. The origins of the library can be traced back to his involvement with the demoscene in the early 2000s. The code was originally developed in the ActionScript language used by Adobe Flash, later being ported to JavaScript in 2009. In Cabello's mind, there were two strong points that justified the shift away from ActionScript: Firstly, JavaScript provided greater platform independence. Secondly, applications written in JavaScript would not need to be compiled by the developer beforehand, unlike Flash applications.

Additional contributions by Cabello include API design, CanvasRenderer, SVGRenderer, and being responsible for merging the commits by the various contributors into the project.

With the advent of WebGL, Paul Brunt was able to implement the new rendering technology quite easily as Three.js was designed with the rendering code as a module rather than in the core itself. Branislav Uličný, an early contributor, started with Three.js in 2010 after having posted a number of WebGL demos on his own site. He wanted WebGL renderer capabilities in Three.js to exceed those of CanvasRenderer or SVGRenderer. His major contributions generally involve materials, shaders, and post-processing.

Soon after the introduction of WebGL 1.0 on Firefox 4 in March 2011, Joshua Koo came on board. He built his first Three.js demo for 3D text in September 2011. His contributions frequently relate to geometry generation.

Three.js has over 1500 contributors on GitHub.

Features 

Three.js includes the following features:

 Effects: Anaglyph, cross-eyed, and parallax barrier.
 Scenes: add and remove objects at run-time; fog
 Cameras: perspective and orthographic; controllers: trackball, FPS, path and more
 Animation: armatures, forward kinematics, inverse kinematics, morph, and keyframe
 Lights: ambient, direction, point, and spot lights; shadows: cast and receive
 Materials: Lambert, Phong, smooth shading, textures, and more
 Shaders: access to full OpenGL Shading Language (GLSL) capabilities: lens flare, depth pass, and extensive post-processing library
 Objects: meshes, particles, sprites, lines, ribbons, bones, and more - all with Level of detail
 Geometry: plane, cube, sphere, torus, 3D text, and more; modifiers: lathe, extrude, and tube
 Data loaders: binary, image, JSON, and scene
 Utilities: full set of time and 3D math functions including frustum, matrix, quaternion, UVs, and more
 Export and import: utilities to create Three.js-compatible JSON files from within: Blender, openCTM, FBX, Max, and OBJ
 Support: API documentation is under construction. A public forum and wiki is in full operation.
 Examples: Over 150 files of coding examples plus fonts, models, textures, sounds, and other support files
 Debugging: Stats.js, WebGL Inspector, Three.js Inspector
 Virtual and Augmented Reality via WebXR
Three.js runs in all browsers supported by WebGL 1.0.

Three.js is made available under the MIT License.

Usage 
The following code creates a scene and adds a camera and cube to the scene. Next, it creates a WebGL renderer and appends its viewport to the body of the webpage document. Once Three.js has finished loading, the cube rotates about its x and y axes.

import * as THREE from 'three';

// init

const camera = new THREE.PerspectiveCamera( 70, window.innerWidth / window.innerHeight, 0.01, 10 );
camera.position.z = 1;

const scene = new THREE.Scene();

const geometry = new THREE.BoxGeometry( 0.2, 0.2, 0.2 );
const material = new THREE.MeshNormalMaterial();

const mesh = new THREE.Mesh( geometry, material );
scene.add( mesh );

const renderer = new THREE.WebGLRenderer( { antialias: true } );
renderer.setSize( window.innerWidth, window.innerHeight );
renderer.setAnimationLoop( animation );
document.body.appendChild( renderer.domElement );

// animation

function animation( time ) {

	mesh.rotation.x = time / 2000;
	mesh.rotation.y = time / 1000;

	renderer.render( scene, camera );

}

See also 

 Google Chrome Experiments
 List of WebGL frameworks
JavaScript framework
JavaScript library

References

Further reading 
 
 
  - "Three.js can make game development easier by taking care of low-level details"

External links 

 
ThreeJS Journey - Learning WebGL with Three.js

2010 software
3D scenegraph APIs
Cross-platform software
Free 3D graphics software
Graphics libraries
JavaScript libraries
Software using the MIT license
WebGL